Mundugumor may be:
Mundugumor people
Mundugumor language